Bù Nho is a rural commune of Phú Riềng District, Bình Phước Province, Vietnam.

References

Populated places in Bình Phước province
District capitals in Vietnam